Charlie's Country is a 2013 Australian drama film directed by Rolf de Heer. It was selected to compete in the Un Certain Regard section at the 2014 Cannes Film Festival where David Gulpilil won the award for Best Actor. It was also screened in the Contemporary World Cinema section at the 2014 Toronto International Film Festival and awarded the Best Fiction Prize and the Youth Jury Prize at the 2015 International Film Festival and Forum on Human Rights (FIFDH) in Geneva.

The film was selected as the Australian entry for the Best Foreign Language Film at the 87th Academy Awards, but was not nominated.

Plot
Charlie, an Aboriginal man who lives in Arnhem Land, in the Northern Territory of Australia, paints tree barks and fishes barramundi fish, all the while feeling out of place in an Australia which is no longer his. He laments the loss of his culture in modern Australia. After his spear is confiscated by the police, who think it is a weapon, he decides to leave his urban Aboriginal community and go back to the bush, his "Mother Country". He falls ill and is rushed to the hospital in Darwin. He discharges himself, then befriends an Aboriginal woman and buys alcohol illegally for other Aboriginal people who are banned from buying alcohol, and he gets arrested. As a result, he is sent to prison.

When he gets out, he agrees to pass on traditional dances from his generation to young Aboriginal boys, fearing the loss of their cultural identity.

Cast
 Peter Djigirr as Black Pete
 Luke Ford as Luke
 Jennifer Budukpuduk Gaykamangu as Faith
 David Gulpilil as Charlie
 Peter Minygululu as Old Lulu
 Ritchie Singer as Darwin Doctor
 Gary Sweet as Darwin Liquor Store owner

Critical reception
Charlie's Country holds an approval rating of 92% on Rotten Tomatoes and 75% on Metacritic. Audiences surveyed by CinemaScore gave the film an average grade of "B" on an A+ to F scale.

Jane Howard of The Guardian wrote a positive review of the film. She argued that the "camera is often motionless and there is a sense of still photography to the work." She added that Gulpilil's flawless acting carried the movie. In the Sydney Morning Herald, Paul Byrnes also praised his "extraordinary grace and physical ease" as an actor. He added, "The level of trust between actor and director here is part of the reason this work will live on." Similarly, writing for The Hollywood Reporter, David Rooney praised the collaboration between de Heer and Gulpilil, arguing, "It's a testament to what de Heer and Gulpilil have achieved here -- with simplicity and infinite nuance -- that through all the highs and devastating lows we witness in this brief chapter of Charlie's life, the character's identity remains etched into every aspect of the performance."

In Variety, Eddie Cockrell praised the cinematography, concluding, "The tech package is seamless. Ian Jones’ widescreen photography immerses the viewer in the Australian outback, while Graham Tardif’s plaintive score emphasizes both the dignity and the anguish of Charlie’s all-too-common plight." In The Australian, Evan Williams called it an "unforgettable film, beautifully made, at times unbearably sad, but tinged with an unquenchable optimism and humanity." He added that some scenes were likely to provoke racism in some viewers, thus helping them question their own ingrained prejudices.

However, writing for the ABC's Radio National, Jason Di Rosso wrote a negative review. He called it "another disappointment in that category of ambitious Australian filmmaking that’s about trying to make art, as well as entertain". He thought that the film lacked ambiguity, adding that there are "thinly drawn racist characters and an inability to render different tones in the one visual idea". He disagreed with other reviewers about de Heer and Gulpilil's close relationship: for Di Rosso, "de Heer hasn’t shown enough faith in his central performer and the collection of beautiful and ugly landscapes he’s drawn together".

Accolades

See also
 List of submissions to the 87th Academy Awards for Best Foreign Language Film
 List of Australian submissions for the Academy Award for Best Foreign Language Film

References

External links
 

2013 films
2013 drama films
Australian drama films
Films directed by Rolf de Heer
Films about Aboriginal Australians
Films set in the Northern Territory
Yolngu-language films
2010s English-language films